Titus LeMoyne Ryan (born May 19, 1984) is a former professional American and Canadian football wide receiver. He was signed by the Kansas City Chiefs as an undrafted free agent in 2007. He played college football at Concordia College, Selma.

Ryan was also a member of the New Orleans Saints, Carolina Panthers, Calgary Stampeders, Winnipeg Blue Bombers, Las Vegas Locos, Dallas Cowboys, and New York Jets.

Professional career

New York Jets
Ryan was signed to the New York Jets' practice squad on December 10, 2012. He was released on December 29, 2012. He signed a reserve/future contract on December 31, 2012. Ryan was released on August 22, 2013.

References

External links
New York Jets bio

1984 births
Living people
Concordia College Alabama alumni
Sportspeople from Tuscaloosa, Alabama
Players of American football from Alabama
American football wide receivers
American players of Canadian football
Canadian football wide receivers
Kansas City Chiefs players
New Orleans Saints players
Carolina Panthers players
Calgary Stampeders players
Winnipeg Blue Bombers players
Dallas Cowboys players
New York Jets players